The Danse Society are an English gothic rock band, formed in Barnsley in 1980. They were originally active until 1987, reforming in 2011. They achieved moderate success during their career. Their lineup included Steve Rawlings (vocals), Paul Nash (guitar), Lyndon Scarfe (keyboards), Tim Wright (bass guitar) and Paul Gilmartin (drums). Scarfe was replaced by David Whitaker (formerly of Music for Pleasure) after the Heaven Is Waiting album.

Background

First incarnation
Originally called Y? and then Danse Crazy (changed due to the emerging Two Tone scene), Danse Society recorded and released their first single, "Clock", on their own newly formed record label Society in 1980. They released their debut studio album, Seduction, in 1982. It reached No. 3 in the UK Indie Chart.

Their second studio album, Heaven Is Waiting, was released in December 1983 on record label Arista. It reached No. 39 in the UK albums chart. The album contained a cover of The Rolling Stones' song "2000 Light Years from Home", also edited in 1984 as a 12" single and as a limited-edition double single. The band recorded a single with producers Stock, Aitken and Waterman, "Say It Again", at the behest of their record company.

In 1986, after releasing their final album, Looking Through, as The Danse Society International, all of the band members except lead singer Rawlings left to form Johnny in the Clouds.

Rawlings continued as Society, and in 1987, released a single, "Saturn Girl". After 1987, Rawlings continued to pursue music with the electronic dance music act Meridian Dream.

Reformation
A campaign titled The Danse Society Reformation Plot was started on Facebook at the end of 2009 and succeeded in bringing most of the band back together. The reformed Danse Society, featuring new vocalist Maethelyiah from the group Blooding Mask, released their fourth studio album, Change of Skin, in July 2011. One of the early demo songs from the reconstituted band's album can still be heard on YouTube, featuring original vocalist Steve Rawlings. And in 2021, it appeared in the "Best Of" Danse Society collection. But Steve did not finish the album, so Maethelyiah performed all the vocals (including the one Steve had sung on) instead. The album release was followed in November 2011 with the first single to be taken from the newly reformed album, "God Cry". In April 2012, they released the second single from Change of Skin, "Vatican", backed with a reworking of their early song "Seduction". Their first live gig in 25 years was performed at Germany's Wave-Gotik-Treffen festival in May 2012, followed by selected festival dates.

An unreleased track called 'Towers' was recorded at the end of 2010 with Steve Rawlings on vocals, his only contribution to the reformation. The music of this track was then used for the title track of the album Change of Skin, with the new singer Maethelyiah who has subsequently fronted the band.

Their fifth studio album, Scarey Tales, was released in February 2013.

On 1 February 2014, Danse Society issued an official announcement that Gilmartin and Roberts had unexpectedly resigned from the band, resulting in the cancellation of a series of tour dates. Nash, Whitaker and Maethelyiah continued with Danse Society, joined by new bassist Lee Jones and drummer Iain Hunter. David Whitaker was replaced by Sam Bollands in late 2014, with Jack Cooper replacing Lee Jones. On 9 December 2014, the single "If I Were Jesus" / "Sound of Silence" was released followed by the sixth studio album on 25 September 2015 called, VI.

In June 2018 the band release an EP, The FUTUR1ST, including a cover of NIN's "Hurt" dedicated to the Sophie Lancaster Foundation, and the tracks "One Thought in Heaven" and "Scream" featuring drummer Joss Rylance who replaced Iain Hunter, and who has subsequently been replaced by Tom Davenport.
September 2020 saw the release of the bands 7th Studio album Sailing Mirrors whilst celebrating their 40 years anniversary.  In June 2021 Dylan Riley replaced Davenport and Jono Mori replaced Bollands for a short UK Tour with Billy Bostanci stepping for Jack Cooper temporarily.  The band are currently in production of their 8th studio album 'The Loop'.

Discography

Studio albums
 Seduction (1982)
 Heaven Is Waiting (1983)
 Looking Through (1986) (as The Danse Society International)
 Change of Skin (2011)
 Scarey Tales (2013)
 VI (2015)
 Sailing Mirrors (2020)

Compilation albums
 The Danse Society (1983)
 The Danse Society (1984)
 Demos Vol. 1 (2011)
 ONT BBC (2020)
 A-Z 40 Years of Danse (2021)
 40 Years of Danse - EXTENDE (2021)

Singles

References

External links
 The Danse Society
 

English post-punk music groups
Musical groups established in 1981
Musical groups disestablished in 1987
Musical groups reestablished in 2011
English gothic rock groups
English new wave musical groups
British dark wave musical groups